Kittrie is a surname. Notable people with the surname include:

Nicholas Kittrie (died 2019), American legal scholar
Orde Kittrie, American legal scholar